CKQM-FM is a Canadian radio station, broadcasting at 105.1 FM in Peterborough, Ontario. Owned by Bell Media, the station airs a country format branded as Pure Country 105. It is a sister station of CKPT-FM.

History
In 1976, Radio CKPT 1420 Ltd. (a division of CHUM Limited), received CRTC approval to operate a new commercial FM station at Peterborough. It would broadcast on a frequency of 105.1 MHz and have an effective radiated power of 50,000 watts (horizontal & vertical). The station was launched on September 16, 1977 with a MOR format. The call sign meaning for CKQM-FM "Quality Music".

In 1983, CKQM switched to a country format in October that year, becoming Country 105.

On March 24, 2009, CKQM received approval by the CRTC to decrease the effective radiated power from 50,000 watts to 7,500 watts, and increasing height above average terrain from 91.5 to 277.5 meters. In FM Broadcasting, effective radiated power is Inversely proportional to antenna height.

On May 13, 2011, the CRTC denied an application by CTV Inc.to modify the technical parameters of CKQM, by increasing effective radiated power from 7,500 watts to 14,000 watts (non-directional antenna) with an effective height of antenna above average terrain of 277.5 metres. 

CKQM has been a country station since 1983 as Country 105 in Peterborough. On May 28, 2019, CKQM and many other Bell Media owned country stations rebranded as Pure Country.

References

External links
 Pure Country 105
 
 

KQM
KQM
KQM
Radio stations established in 1977
1977 establishments in Ontario